Ultimate Women Challenge was an unaired show featuring 16 female fighters who would win a prize of $50,000. During the filming of the Ultimate Women Challenge, Kaitlin Young faced Julie Kedzie on September 24, 2010. She defeated Kedzie by split decision.

Cast
Martha Benavides
Heather Jo Clark
Brandi Haines
Barb Honchak
Angela Hayes
Julie Kedzie
Angela Magaña
Casey Noland
Michelle Ould
Colleen Schneider
Karina Taylor
Patricia Vidonic
Kaitlin Young

Production problems, litigation, and financial problems
The production was plagued with problems, with cast members later recounting to the press that they had been provided with insufficient food by the producers during the filming, and that there had been a lack of medical attention when an injury occurred.

The show's financier, Sean M. Morrison, foreclosed on rights to the show after the original producer, Lyle Howry Productions, did not repay a $600,000 loan. The producer had experienced financial problems from the start of the production.

Several fighters launched a lawsuit in Wisconsin against Lyle Howry Productions for nonpayment.

Morrison filed a lawsuit in Illinois federal court against several competitors in which he charged that they had misappropriated trade secrets by revealing the outcome of the series.

References

External links
 
Ultimate Women Challenge event results on Sherdog

Unaired television shows
2010s American reality television series
Martial arts television series
NBC original programming